Ketonen is a Finnish surname. Notable people with the surname include:

 Arvo Ketonen (1888–1948), Finnish journalist, media executive and politician
 Irja Ketonen (1921-1988), Finnish media executive
 Kari Ketonen (born 1971), Finnish actor
 Carina Kirssi Ketonen (born 1976), Finnish former racing cyclist

Finnish-language surnames